AHCA is the American Health Care Act of 2017, a United States Congress bill to partially repeal the Patient Protection and Affordable Care Act (Obamacare)

AHCA may also refer to:

 American Health Care Association, U.S. federation of affiliated state health organizations
 American Hockey Coaches Association
 Albion Hills Conservation Area, Canada
 Archer Heights Civic Association, neighborhood organization in Chicago, United States